The IndyCar Series operation of McLaren (competing as Arrow McLaren due to sponsorship) is based in Indianapolis and was founded by former IndyCar driver Sam Schmidt in 2001 as Sam Schmidt Motorsports. After a series of partnerships and name changes, the team (then known as Arrow Schmidt Peterson Motorsports) formed what was initially a joint entry with McLaren for the 2020 season known as Arrow McLaren SP. Schmidt and co-owner Ric Peterson would sell 75% of the team to McLaren following the 2021 season and remain on the team's board of governors, which is chaired by McLaren CEO Zak Brown. The team operates the Nos. 5, 6 and 7 Dallara-Chevrolet entries for Pato O'Ward, Felix Rosenqvist and Alexander Rossi, respectively.

History

Schmidt's injury and team origins

On January 6, 2000, Sam Schmidt was in Orlando, Florida practicing at the Walt Disney World Speedway when his car crashed exiting turn two, hitting the outside wall at approximately 180 mph. Schmidt was airlifted to a nearby hospital in extremely critical condition. He was diagnosed as a quadriplegic, the result of a severe injury to his spinal cord at the C-3/C-4 levels and was on a respirator for 5 months. In 2001, 14 months after his accident, Schmidt announced the formation of Sam Schmidt Motorsports.

Ownership and name changes
For 2012, the team was renamed to Schmidt Hamilton Motorsports after fellow ex-driver Davey Hamilton brought the team enough sponsorship to continue racing in IndyCar full-time. Canadian businessman Ric Peterson purchased a stake in the team in 2013 to form Schmidt Peterson Motorsports. In 2019, primary sponsor Arrow Electronics became the title sponsor for the team, resulting in the Arrow Schmidt Peterson Motorsports banner for that year. For 2020, the team reached an agreement with McLaren Racing to become a joint entry, with the combined team being known as Arrow McLaren SP. Schmidt and Peterson remained as the sole co-owners until McLaren purchased a 75% stake after the 2021 season, with McLaren CEO Zak Brown installed as chairman. Schmidt and Peterson currently share the remaining 25% stake in the team and remain on the team's board of governors. For the 2023 season, the team dropped the “SP” branding to become Arrow McLaren.

IndyCar
Davey Hamilton began 2001 in the car and drove five races, including the team's first Indianapolis 500, ending with an injury at Texas Motor Speedway. He was replaced by Jaques Lazier who drove four races and three other drivers who drove a few races each. Richie Hearn made nine starts for the team in 2002 as he switched between the team's two cars, the No. 99 and No. 20. Anthony Lazzaro drove in the first three races of the year in the No. 99, but handed over Indy 500 driving duties to Mark Dismore, who made his only start for the team in that year's '500'.

Also, in 2002, the Indy Pro Series was founded and Schmidt eventually refocused its efforts on that series, running only the Indy 500 as its sole IndyCar series race with a car driven from 2003 to 2005 by Hearn and in 2006 by Airton Daré. In 2007 the team fielded a car in the Indy 500 for Buddy Lazier. In 2008, while the team did not field a car of its own, it prepared and engineered Rubicon Race Team's entry for Max Papis that failed to qualify after suffering numerous gearbox problems during qualifying. The team made a joint entry with Chip Ganassi Racing for the 2009 Indianapolis 500, piloted by Alex Lloyd. The arrangement with Chip Ganassi continued in 2010 for the Indy 500 with Townsend Bell driving.

For 2011, SSM purchased the assets of FAZZT Race Team, retaining some of the personnel and all sponsors, including Alex Tagliani. Townsend Bell, Jay Howard, and Wade Cunningham also drove for SSM in the 2011 IndyCar Series season.

Chris Griffis, the team manager for Sam Schmidt Motorsports' Indy Lights team, died on September 12, 2011. He was 46. Just over a month later, at the 2011 season finale, Dan Wheldon died after he was involved in a 15-car wreck at Las Vegas Motor Speedway. Wheldon was driving the No. 77 in a joint deal between SSM and Bryan Herta Autosport.

In 2012 SSM fielded a car for Frenchman Simon Pagenaud for the full season backed by Hewlett-Packard. Davey Hamilton joined Schmidt to field the number 77 car. Pagenaud went on to win the IZOD IndyCar Rookie of the Year Award. Pagenaud would score four podiums that year, while Bell returned for the Indianapolis 500" finishing 9th.

In 2013, Pagenaud would be teamed with another Frenchman, Tristan Vautier, for the season. Schmidt would also bring on another investor, former Champ Car Atlantic owner Ric Peterson. While Vautier had a best finish of 10th, Pagenaud would score two wins for Schmidt at Detroit Round 2 and Baltimore, finishing third in points. Vautier was released at the end of 2013 and replaced by Russian driver Mikhail Aleshin. Pagenaud would go on to win the inaugural GP of Indianapolis and finish 5th in points. Aleshin would carry multiple top-10 finishes with a best finish of second at Houston round 2. However, a crash at Fontana ruled him out of the finale, and visa restrictions forced Aleshin to sit out 2015. Pagenaud would leave for Team Penske, with SPM taking on James Hinchcliffe and James Jakes. While the team would have a 1-3 finish at 2015 Indy Grand Prix of Louisiana with Hinchcliffe winning, the season would come undone at Indianapolis. During qualifying. Hinchcliffe crashed hard in turns 1-2 and was airlifted to a hospital. Eventually forced out due to his injuries, Ryan Briscoe and Conor Daly (who drove a No. 43 car at the Indy 500) shared the car for the remainder of the year.

For 2016, Hinchcliffe and Aleshin (who drove a third No. 77 car at the 2015 season finale at Sonoma) would return to SPM. While neither driver scored a victory, Hinchcliffe would lose a close battle in Texas to Graham Rahal, while Aleshin would win his first pole at Pocono Raceway and Hinchcliffe sat on the pole for the 100th Indianapolis 500. The No. 77 would return for Indy, with Jay Howard driving with support from Tony Stewart. The team's lineup would remain unchanged for 2017. While Hinchcliffe would win at Long Beach, Aleshin would struggle heavily during his second year. During the Road America weekend, Aleshin was delayed by visa issues coming from France (where he participated in the 24 Hours of Le Mans). Deutsche Tourenwagen Masters driver Robert Wickens filled in for Aleshin during practice, though Aleshin later arrived at the track and raced. By Toronto, Aleshin was parked by SPM and replaced by Sebastián Saavedra. It was announced on August 12 that Aleshin would no longer race for SPM and would be replaced by Saavedra and Jack Harvey for the remainder of the season.

In 2018, SPM announced it had extended James Hinchcliffe's contract, as well as signing fellow Canadian Robert Wickens to drive the No. 7 (later renumbered to No. 6) for 2018. Leena Gade became Hinchcliffe's lead race engineer for the 2018 season, becoming the first female lead race engineer in Indycar. Wickens then suffered a horrific crash during the 2018 ABC Supply 500 at Pocono Raceway, a crash that left him a paraplegic. Wickens issued a further statement clarifying that he was hopeful to be able to walk again, due to his spinal cord being bruised rather than completely severed and that he had felt 'some feeling and movement' back in his legs although the nerves were not in a state to walk, with Wickens hoping that he will be able to walk on his own within two years of the accident.

In 2019, Arrow became title sponsor of SPM, with the team name changing to Arrow Schmidt Peterson Motorsports. In addition, the team also signed former Sauber Formula One driver Marcus Ericsson to become one of the team's drivers for the 2019 season. Marcus will drive the No. 7 as the No. 6 is reserved for Wickens should he be able to make a return in 2019.

In August 2019, SPM entered into a collaboration with McLaren for the 2020 season onwards, with the team to be named Arrow McLaren Racing SP and thus terminating Honda's engine remaining contract in favor of Chevrolet engines.

Patricio O'Ward and Oliver Askew drove for the team in 2020. During the COVID-19 pandemic that disrupted the season, the team was revealed to have received a loan from the Paycheck Protection Program along with numerous other race teams and race tracks to keep employees on the payroll and protect from any potential loss of sponsors. Askew was let go by the team after the season and was replaced by Felix Rosenqvist.

In 2021 Arrow McLaren SP became the first Chevrolet powered team other than Team Penske to win an IndyCar race since 2016, when Pato O'Ward took his first IndyCar series victory at Texas Motor Speedway. This was also Schmidt Peterson's first victory since 2018 and McLaren's first open wheel racing victory since 2012. O'Ward would take a second victory on the season at Race 2 in Detroit, the first time the team had two wins in a season since 2014 and their first road or street course win since 2017. For the 105th Indianapolis 500 the team would expand to three cars, with Juan Pablo Montoya driving the third car. Oliver Askew returned to the team briefly for Race 2 in Detroit after Rosenqvist was injured in a crash the previous day while former McLaren F1 driver Kevin Magnussen would fill in for Rosenqvist at Road America. On August 8, 2021, McLaren announced they had purchased a 75% ownership stake in the team, with Schmidt and Peterson sharing a 25% stake in the team and remaining on the team's board of governors. Lead sponsor Arrow Electronics also signed an extension with the team that would have them as the primary sponsor through the 2029 season.

For the 2022 IndyCar Series, the team's first under McLaren ownership, both O'Ward and Rosenqvist would return to the team as full time entries. The #6 car would again return on a part-time basis for the GMR Grand Prix and the 2022 Indianapolis 500 driven by Juan Pablo Montoya. O'Ward and Rosenqvist would finish second and fourth in the Indianapolis 500 respectively, the team's best finish at Indianapolis to date.  the team announced they had signed Alexander Rossi to drive a third full time car from 2023 and beyond. 

For 2023, the team announced they had signed Alexander Rossi to drive a third full time car. Additionally, team president Taylor Kiel left the team. His duties were parsed and redistributed between Brian Barnhart, who joins the team with Rossi from Andretti Autosport as General Manager, and Gavin Ward.

Indy Lights
Schmidt's Indy Pro Series – later Indy Lights – program has been one of the most successful in the series' recent history, winning the 2004 championship with Thiago Medeiros, the 2006 title with Jay Howard, and the 2007 title with Alex Lloyd. After two less successful seasons, it captured its third championship in 2010 with Jean-Karl Vernay. Once again on top, the team took home a 2012 Lights championship title with Tristan Vautier. For 2013 the team's Indy Lights drivers were Jack Hawksworth, Gabby Chaves, and Sage Karam. Karam won the championship in 2013, becoming the eighth rookie to become series champion.

Schmidt fielded four drivers in 2014. Jack Harvey was runner-up with four wins and ten podiums in fourteen races. Luiz Razia ended fifth with one win and five podiums. Juan Pablo García finished sixth and Juan Piedrahita was seventh, both with no podiums. In 2015, Harvey was runner-up again with two wins and eight podiums in sixteen races. RC Enerson finished fourth with one win and five podiums. Scott Anderson and Ethan Ringel ended ninth and eleventh respectively with one podium each.

For 2016, Schmidt would field cars for Santiago Urrutia and Andre Negrao. While Urrutia would win the most races of any driver, he would lose the Lights title to Ed Jones of Carlin. In late 2016, Schmidt announced that he would end his Indy Lights program, wanting to divert resources to the team's IndyCar program.

In April 2017, Schmidt Peterson announced a driver development program partnership with the Indy Lights team Belardi Auto Racing. As part of the deal, Schmidt Peterson sponsor Arrow Electronics will also sponsor Belardi driver Santiago Urrutia.

Racing results

IndyCar Series
(key)

* Season still in progress

  In conjunction with Chip Ganassi Racing.
  In conjunction with Bryan Herta Autosport.
  Dan Wheldon was killed during the running of the 2011 IZOD IndyCar World Championship.
  In conjunction with Rahal Letterman Lanigan Racing.
  In conjunction with AFS Racing.
  The final race at Las Vegas was canceled due to Dan Wheldon's death.
  In conjunction with AFS Racing and Kingdom Racing.
  In conjunction with Team Pelfrey.
  In conjunction with SMP Racing.
  In conjunction with Meyer Shank Racing
  In conjunction with MotoGator Team Stange Racing
  In conjunction with McLaren Racing

IndyCar Series wins

Complete Indy Lights results

(key)

References

External links
 
 IndyCar Team Page

2001 establishments in the United States
American auto racing teams
Indy Lights teams
IndyCar Series teams
McLaren Group
Auto racing teams established in 2001